Love in the Afternoon (released in North America as Chloe in the Afternoon) is a 1972 French romantic comedy-drama film written and directed by Éric Rohmer. It is the sixth and final installment in Rohmer's Six Moral Tales series.

An English-language remake starring Chris Rock, titled I Think I Love My Wife, was released in 2007. Singer-songwriter St. Vincent named the opening song of her 2011 album, Strange Mercy, after the film.

Plot
Frédéric, the young and successful partner in a Paris business firm, is happily married to Hélène, an English teacher, and father to one child with another on the way. Still, something eats away at him. While going through his day, Frédéric begins to ponder the times before he was married, when he was free to be with any woman he wanted and could feel the deep satisfaction of anticipation while he chased them. At one point, he has an elaborate fantasy where he possesses a magical amulet that causes all women to bow to his will (the sequence features actresses from previous "Six Moral Tales" instalments). These thoughts do not distress Frédéric, though, as he sees these ideas as a reflection of how true his love to his wife is.

One day, Chloé, a woman from Frédéric's past, stops by his office, hungry and homeless. Chloé had once been the girlfriend of an old friend of Frédéric's, and had caused this friend a great deal of grief. At first Frédéric believes Chloé only wants cash and company, but over time, as she tries a series of jobs to attempt some type of solidity in her life, to the increasing amusement of the secretaries in Frédéric's office, the two begin spending afternoons together, talking of many things Frédéric finds himself unable to talk to his wife about. He enjoys the pleasures of an attractive mistress without the guilt of adultery, while she has a man who will do whatever she wants without needing sex.

After the birth of Frédéric's second child, Chloé decides she, too, needs a child to give focus to her aimless existence and, while she has no desire to be tied in marriage, that Frédéric must be the father. He ponders whether to stay with the faithful wife he loves greatly or whether to launch into the unknown with a woman for whom he feels a strange deep passion. A decision is precipitated when Chloé summons him to her latest address and, when he arrives, she is in the bath. Emerging, she invites him to towel her dry, which he does, and then calls him to her bed. Leaving her naked and waiting, he flees out of the apartment. When he goes home to Hélène and asks to spend the afternoon with her, she breaks down in tears. He comforts her, and they go to their bedroom.

Cast

Reception
On Rotten Tomatoes, the film has an approval rating of 91% based on reviews from 22 critics. The site's consensus states "Chloe in the Afternoon doesn't need sparkly cinematic dross to discover unspoken, universal truths about relationships and love through filmmaking".

Roger Ebert]of the Chicago Sun-Times gave it 4 out 4 stars, calling it the best of Rohmer's "Six Moral Tales" series, and adding:It is also the most fully rounded, lacking the one-dimensional tone of some of his earlier tales. It's as if he were striking notes in the previous works, and is now bringing them all together into a chord; the final scene in "Chloe" is his last comment on the series, and Rohmer is telling us to, for god's sake, stop playing games and embrace each other with honesty.Vincent Canby of the New York Times gave the film a positive review, writing "because Mr. Rohmer keeps his focus short, clear and precise, one sees deeply into the lives of his characters without the sort of pretentious distortions of most movies that deal in metaphors".

In contrast, Pauline Kael wrote "it had evaporated a half hour after I saw it. It’s about as forgettable as a movie can be."

References

External links
 
 
 Howard Schumann, "Six Moral Tales"
 Love in the Afternoon: Marriage, Rohmer-Style an essay by Armond White at the Criterion Collection

1972 films
1972 comedy-drama films
1972 romantic drama films
1970s French-language films
1970s romantic comedy-drama films
Adultery in films
Films directed by Éric Rohmer
Films produced by Barbet Schroeder
Films set in Paris
Films shot in Paris
French romantic comedy-drama films
1970s French films